Shame is a 2011 British psychological erotic drama film, set in New York, directed by Steve McQueen, co-written by McQueen and Abi Morgan, and starring Michael Fassbender and Carey Mulligan as grown siblings. It was co-produced by Film4 and See-Saw Films. The film's explicit scenes reflecting the protagonist's sexual addiction resulted in a rating of NC-17 in the United States. Shame was released in the United Kingdom on 13 January 2012. It received generally positive reviews, with praise for Fassbender's and Mulligan's performances, realistic depiction of sexual addiction, and direction.

Plot 
Brandon Sullivan is an executive living in New York City; he frequently has sex with prostitutes, views pornography, and masturbates several times daily. One day, Brandon makes eye contact with a woman wearing an engagement ring on the subway during his morning commute. She initially reciprocates but becomes uncomfortable. When they exit, she disappears into the crowd. Brandon and his married boss, David, hit on women at a club. Later, Brandon has sex in a back alley with a woman David was pursuing at the club.

Brandon has been ignoring calls from his sister, Sissy, who is a lounge singer. He arrives at his apartment and is startled to find her in his shower. Sissy has a few gigs in the city and asks to stay; he later hears her pleading on the telephone with her lover not to reject her. Brandon and David watch Sissy perform "New York, New York" in a bar, which makes Brandon emotional. David flirts with Sissy and notices scars from self-inflicted wounds on her arms. Sissy has sex with David in her brother's bedroom. Later that night, she attempts to get in bed with Brandon; he orders her out of the room.

After the computer system at Brandon's company is infected with a computer virus, they find that his hard drive is full of pornography. David assumes Brandon's intern is responsible. Brandon goes on a date with co-worker Marianne, who is recently separated and believes in commitment, while Brandon dislikes the idea of marriage and admits that his relationships never last longer than four months. When they reach the subway, they go home separately.

That night, Sissy discovers Brandon masturbating in his bathroom. He attacks her and accuses her of spying on him. She finds his laptop open on a pornographic webcam site; Brandon slams it shut, and a disturbed Sissy leaves. Brandon disposes of his pornography, sex toys, and laptop. In the office, he kisses Marianne and the two get a hotel room, but Brandon cannot get an erection. Marianne leaves; later, Brandon has aggressive sex with a prostitute in the same room.

Brandon tells Sissy that David has a family and asks her to leave. She says that, as family, they should help each other, but Brandon calls her irresponsible and a burden. He goes to a bar and propositions a woman, describing explicitly what he would do to her. She is close to succumbing when her boyfriend intervenes. Brandon laughs in his face. After he leaves, the boyfriend follows and brutally beats him. When he is barred from another club, he goes to a nearby gay bar and is fellated by a man. After leaving, he listens to a voicemail from Sissy, crying as she says that they are not bad people but just come from a bad place. Brandon has a threesome with prostitutes.

While Brandon is riding the subway home, the passengers are asked to disembark due to a police emergency, implicitly a suicide. He frantically calls Sissy, but she does not answer. Arriving home, he finds Sissy on the bathroom floor covered in blood, having slashed her wrists. He attempts to stop the bleeding while phoning for help. She survives and he comforts her in hospital. After leaving, he walks until he collapses, sobbing, in the rain.

On the subway, Brandon makes eye contact with the woman with the engagement ring again. This time, she holds her stare at him and appears to be more comfortable with the situation. She stands up, ready to exit the train at an approaching station. Brandon does not take his eyes off her.

Cast
 Michael Fassbender as Brandon Sullivan
 Carey Mulligan as Sissy Sullivan
 James Badge Dale as David
 Nicole Beharie as Marianne
 Alex Manette as Steven
 Lucy Walters as The Subway Lady
 Elizabeth Masucci as Elizabeth
 Amy Hargreaves as Hotel Lover
 Hannah Ware as Samantha
 Robert Montano as Waiter

Production

Development and casting
McQueen worked with producer Iain Canning on the 2008 film Hunger and they reunited to develop Shame with Canning and Emile Sherman's UK/Australia-based See-Saw Films. Screenwriter Abi Morgan was chosen to write the script, making it one of two films she worked on with Film4 (the other being The Iron Lady).

McQueen's lead actor in Hunger, Michael Fassbender, was the first and only choice to play the lead role in Shame. Actors Carey Mulligan and James Badge Dale joined the cast in December 2010 to play the younger sister and boss, respectively, of Fassbender's character. "I had so many passes I couldn't even tell you", said casting director Avy Kaufman, who faced the challenge of casting an NC-17-rated film. Kaufman had a unique assignment from McQueen, who wanted top-quality actors even for tiny parts like Brandon's fly-by-night sexual partners. "The idea was that those partners would propel the story forward with their silence, showing Brandon's state of mind, or even suggesting the history of their relationship with a look or a gesture. The actresses, of course, also had to meet certain physical requirements."

Filming
Production was scheduled to begin on location in New York in January 2011. Fassbender later commented in an interview that he just began shooting his scenes in early March. A majority of the film was shot in and around Chelsea. The office scenes were filmed in the Citigroup Center and the hotel scenes and nightclub scene were shot at the Standard Hotel in the Meatpacking District.

Soundtrack

A soundtrack was released via Sony Classical Records on 6 December 2011.

 "New York, New York "Theme"" arrangement and production by Stephen Oremus and piano by Liz Caplan

Personnel
 David Butterworth – orchestration (1, 11, 15)
 Rolf Wilson – leader (1, 11, 15)
 Nick Wollage – engineering, recording, mixing (1, 11, 15)
 Pete Hutchings – assistant engineering (1, 11, 15)
 Manfred Melchior – mastering
 Ian Wood – score editor (1, 11, 15)
 Isobel Griffiths – orchestra contractor (1, 11, 15)
 Lucy Whalley – assistant orchestra contractor (1, 11, 15)
 White Label Productions – design
 Steve McQueen – liner notes

Release
Shame premiered at The 68th Venice Film Festival in the main competition. Fassbender won the Volpi Cup for Best Actor at the Venice Film Festival for his role in the film. It was also screened at The 36th Toronto International Film Festival, The 49th New York Film Festival, The 55th B.F.I. London Film Festival and The 34th Starz Denver Film Festival.

Shame was released in the UK on 13 January 2012, after the limited release screening in the US that commenced on 2 December 2011. Fox Searchlight Pictures paid around $400,000 to acquire the United States distribution rights of Shame.

US rating
The film was rated NC-17 (no one under 17 and under admitted) by the Motion Picture Association of America for some explicit sexual content. Fox Searchlight did not appeal the rating or make cuts for the less restrictive R rating. Searchlight president Steve Gilula said, "I think NC-17 is a badge of honor, not a scarlet letter. We believe it is time for the rating to become usable in a serious manner".

Home media
The film was released on Blu-ray and DVD in April 2012.

Reception

Critical response
On review aggregator Rotten Tomatoes, 79% of critics have given the film a positive review based on 228 reviews, with an average rating of 7.5/10. The website's critics consensus reads, "Boasting stellar performances by Michael Fassbender and Carey Mulligan, Shame is a powerful plunge into the mania of addiction affliction." On Metacritic, it has a weighted average score of 72 out of 100, based on 41 critics, indicating "generally favorable reviews".

Roger Ebert of Chicago Sun-Times gave the film four out of four stars and described it as "a powerful film" and "courageous and truthful", commenting that "this is a great act of filmmaking and acting. I don't believe I would be able to see it twice." Ebert later named it the second best film of 2011. Todd McCarthy of The Hollywood Reporter gave the film a positive review, stating, "Driven by a brilliant, ferocious performance by Michael Fassbender, Shame is a real walk on the wild side, a scorching look at a case of sexual addiction that's as all-encompassing as a craving for drugs."

Dan Bullock of The Hollywood News said, "Shame is captivating and intensely intimate. McQueen has followed Hunger with an unflinching and compelling film that explores the depths of addiction and the consequential destruction and demise of the mind and although it is sometimes difficult to watch, you won't be able to keep your eyes off it." Justin Chang of Variety gave the film a positive review, commenting, "A mesmerizing companion piece to his 2008 debut, Hunger, this more approachable but equally uncompromising drama likewise fixes its gaze on the uses and abuses of the human body, as Michael Fassbender again strips himself down, in every way an actor can, for McQueen's rigorous but humane interrogation."

Writing in The New York Times, A. O. Scott said, "McQueen wants to show how the intensity of Brandon's need shuts him off from real intimacy, but this seems to be a foregone conclusion, the result of an elegant experiment that was rigged from the start."  Donald Clarke of The Irish Times called it "the most wholesome film made about unwholesomeness since The Exorcist" noting that "the underlying current of Puritanism is, however, more than a little oppressive".

Writing for MUBI, Ignatiy Vishnevetsky said, "Every scene [is] ladled with big dollops of cinema's most respectable cop-out: ambiguity ... Shame wears its emptiness like a badge of honor; McQueen is trying for banal blankness, and though he succeeds in that respect, you kind of wish that a filmmaker (and one with a background as an artist at that) would aspire to do more than just say nothing."

In the blog for the British journal The Art of Psychiatry, psychiatrist Abby Seltzer praised Mulligan for her portrayal of an individual with borderline personality disorder. While she had initially approached the film warily because of reviews that focused on Brandon's sex addiction, she found it "a moving and accurate portrayal of psychopathology ... [that should be]  compulsory viewing for all practising clinicians."

Top-ten lists

 1st – David Fear, Time Out New York
 1st – Gregory Ellwood, HitFix
 2nd – Joshua Rothkopf, Time Out New York
 2nd – Roger Ebert, Chicago Sun-Times
 2nd – Marc Savlov, Austin Chronicle
 3rd – Marshall Fine, Hollywood & Fine
 3rd – Peter Knegt, Indiewire
 3rd – James Berardinelli, Reelviews
 4th – Kimberley Jones, Austin Chronicle
 5th – Kate Erbland, Boxoffice Magazine
 5th – Kristopher Tapley, HitFix
 5th – Sasha Stone, Awards Daily
 6th – James Rocchi, Boxoffice Magazine
 6th – Scott Feinberg, The Hollywood Reporter
 6th – Elizabeth Weitzman, New York Daily News
 6th – Christopher Bell, Indiewire
 7th – Liam Lacey and Rick Groen, The Globe and Mail
 7th – Aaron Hills, Village Voice
 8th – Kevin Jagernauth, Indiewire
 10th – Alison Willmore, The A.V. Club
 10th – Don Kaye, MSN Movies
 10th – Todd McCarthy, The Hollywood Reporter

In 2016, it was ranked one of the 100 greatest motion pictures since 2000 in a critics' poll conducted by BBC Culture.

Accolades

References

External links
 
 
 
 
 
 

2011 films
2011 drama films
2011 independent films
2010s British films
2010s English-language films
2010s erotic drama films
2010s psychological drama films
Borderline personality disorder in fiction
British erotic drama films
British films set in New York City
British independent films
British LGBT-related films
British psychological drama films
Casual sex in films
Film4 Productions films
Films about dysfunctional families
Films about sex addiction
Films about siblings
Films directed by Steve McQueen
Films set in Manhattan
Films shot in New York City
HanWay Films films
Male bisexuality in film